Chimique, a shamanic herb is a drug mixing tobacco impregnated with alcohol and synthetic cannabinoids, has spread very quickly in Mayotte and concerns a significant part of the population, especially young men in precarious situations, according to the French Observatory for Drugs and Drug Addiction (OFDT).

Health

References

Cannabis in France
Drug culture
Health in Mayotte